Pafenolol is a beta adrenergic receptor antagonist.

References

Beta blockers
Ureas
Isopropylamino compounds
N-isopropyl-phenoxypropanolamines